The following is a list of weekly number-one albums on the Billboard Japan Hot Albums chart in 2017.

Chart history

See also
 List of Hot 100 number-one singles of 2017

References

Number-one albums
Japan Oricon Albums
2017